BC Camplight (born Brian Christinzio; 31 May 1979) is an American songwriter and multi-instrumentalist.

His 2005 album Hide, Run Away was released by One Little Indian and featured Cynthia G. Mason on vocals. Camplight's follow up, Blink of a Nihilist, was released in 2007. The third album came out in January 2015 on Bella Union. Christinzio's later lyrics regularly explore his personal life and self-destructive tendencies, including struggles with depression and alcohol.

Biography
Originally from Wenonah, New Jersey, Christinzio relocated to Philadelphia, Pennsylvania, United States, in 2003. He soon signed a record deal with One Little Indian and established himself on the city's live music scene. He played live with members of The War on Drugs and appeared as a session piano player on Sharon Van Etten's 2011 album "Epic" among other collaborations.

On the One Little Indian label, Christinzio released two albums, one in 2005 and another in 2007. They were critically well received, but did not succeed commercially. He was dropped by the label and nearly quit music altogether while struggling with mental health issues, drugs, and alcohol.

Christinzio relocated to Manchester, England in 2012, following the advice of a fan on social media. There he recuperated and returned to writing and performing. In October 2014 Bella Union announced it will be releasing BC Camplight's already-recorded third album, How to Die in the North, in January 2015.

However, in early 2015 Christinzio overstayed his visa permissions due to a severe leg injury and was made to leave the UK, resulting in the cancellation of his band's summer tour which was to include performances at the Green Man and End of the Road festivals and an appearance on Later... with Jools Holland. Gigs in other countries went ahead as planned, including a debut tour in the US. Christinzio has since temporarily resided in Paris and Philadelphia. BC Camplight toured the West Coast of America for the first time in the spring of 2016. He has since re-settled in Manchester with an Italian passport, care of his grandparents.

In 2017 Christinzio recorded a new album, Deportation Blues, released on Bella Union in summer 2018.

In 2021, the BC live band consists of Christinzio (piano/vocals), Luke Barton (vocals/synth/guitar), Stephen Mutch (bass), Thom Bellini (guitar), Adam Dawson (drums) and Francesca Pidgeon (vocals/synth/percussion/saxophone).

In 2020 Christinzio released his fifth album, Shortly After Takeoff, released on Bella Union in April 2020. It marked the completion of his so called 'Manchester Trilogy' which also includes his previous two albums released on Bella Union. It became Christinzio's most commercial and critically successful record to date with The Guardian calling it "A Masterpiece".

Discography

Hide, Run Away (One Little Indian, 2005)
 "Couldn't You Tell" 3:24
 "Blood and Peanut Butter"	3:54
 "Emily's Dead to Me" 1:57
 "Hide Runaway" 5:19
 "Wouldn't Mind The Sunshine" 4:28
 "Parapaleejo"	3:17
 "Oranges In Winter" 4:36
 "If You Think I Don't Mean It" 2:01
 "La La La" 4:38
 "Richard Dawson" 3:26
 "Sleep With Your Lights On" 4:23

Blink of a Nihilist (One Little Indian, 2007)
 "Suffer For Two" 2:57
 "Lord, I've Been On Fire" 3:45
 "Werewolf Waltz" 1:22
 "Forget About Your Bones" 2:57
 "Say Tonto!" 4:06
 "The Hip And The Homeless" 3:45
 "The 22 Skidoo" 3:34
 "Officer Down" 3:44
 "Grey Young Amelia" 5:20
 "I've Got A Bad Cold" 2:04
 "Scare Me Sweetly" 4:46

How to Die in the North (Bella Union, 2015)
 "You Should've Gone to School" 4:29
 "Love Isn't Anybody's Fault" 3:09
 "Just Because I Love You"	5:13
 "Grim Cinema"	3:55
 "Good Morning Headache" 5:31 
 "Thieves in Antigua" 4:07
 "Atom Bomb" 4:47
 "Lay Me on the Floor"	5:52
 "Why Doesn't Anybody Fall in Love Anymore" 3:32

Deportation Blues (Bella Union, 2018)
 “Deportation Blues” 4:44
 “I'm In a Weird Place Now” 4:32
 “Hell or Pennsylvania” 4:29
 “I'm Desperate” 4:09
 “When I Think of My Dog” 4:12
 “Am I Dead Yet?” 5:26
 “Midnight Ease” 4:58
 “Fire in England” 3:44
 “Until You Kiss Me” 3:03

Shortly After Takeoff (Bella Union, 2020)
 "I Only Drink When I'm Drunk"	3:44
 "Ghosthunting" 5:33
 "Back To Work" 4:11
 "Cemetery Lifestyle" 3:42
 "I Want To Be In The Mafia" 4:37 
 "Shortly After Takeoff" 3:31
 "Arm Around Your Sadness"	3:34
 "Born To Cruise" 3:35
 "Angelo" 1:32

The Last Rotation of Earth (Bella Union, 2023)
 "The Last Rotation of Earth"	4:09
 "The Movie" 0:00
 "It Never Rains in Manchester" 0:00
 "Kicking Up a Fuss" 0:00
 "She’s Gone Cold" 0:00
 "Fear Life in a Dozen Years" 0:00
 "Going Out on a Low Note"	0:00
 "I’m Ugly" 0:00
 "The Mourning" 0:00

References

External links
Official website

1980 births
Living people
Songwriters from New Jersey
American indie rock musicians
American expatriates in the United Kingdom
American male pianists
21st-century American pianists
21st-century American male singers
21st-century American singers
One Little Independent Records artists
Nettwerk Music Group artists
Musicians from New Jersey
People from Wenonah, New Jersey
American male songwriters